Kathmandu College of Management, popularly known as KCM, is a college of higher education located in Gwarko, Lalitpur, Nepal. KCM is the first management college to introduce BBA program in Nepal. It is affiliated to Siam University and is considered one of the premier management schools in Nepal. The admission is conducted by an entrance exam followed by a group discussion and interview.

KCM offers specialized Business administration (BBA) programs in Marketing & Banking and Finance.

Notable alumni
Nirajan Shah (Late Prince of Nepal)
Bartika Eam Rai (Singer/ Songwriter/ Poet)
Sajjan Raj Vaidya (Singer/ Songwriter/ Guitarist/Composer)
 Nirvana Chaudhary (Managing Director of CG)

References

External links
Kathmandu College of Management
Siam University
Admissions

Universities and colleges in Nepal
Business schools
1997 establishments in Nepal